Ariel is a fictional character in Walt Disney Pictures' 28th animated feature film The Little Mermaid (1989). Ariel is voiced by Jodi Benson in all official animated appearances and merchandise. The fourth Disney Princess, Ariel is the seventh-born daughter of King Triton and Queen Athena of an underwater kingdom of merfolk called Atlantica. She is often rebellious, and in the first film, she longs to be a part of the human world. She marries Prince Eric, whom she rescued from a shipwreck, and together they have a daughter, Melody. She is the first Disney Princess to be developed during the Disney Renaissance.

The character is based on the title character of Hans Christian Andersen's 1837 fairy tale "The Little Mermaid" but was developed into a different personality for the 1989 animated film adaptation. Ariel has received a mixed reception from critics; some publications such as Time criticize her for being too devoted to Eric whereas others, such as Empire, praise the character for her rebellious personality, a departure from previous Disney Princesses' roles. Halle Bailey will portray a live-action version of the character in the upcoming live-action adaptation of the original 1989 film.

Development

Ariel was based on the title character of Hans Christian Andersen's "The Little Mermaid", but co-director and writer Ron Clements felt that the mermaid in the original story was too tragic and rewrote the character, resulting in Ariel.

Jodi Benson, who was predominantly a stage actress, was chosen to voice Ariel because the directors felt "it was really important to have the same person doing the singing and speaking voice". Clements stated that Benson's voice had a unique "sweetness" and "youthfulness". When recording the vocals for "Part of Your World", Benson asked that the lights in the studio be dimmed, to create the feeling of being deep under the sea. "Part of Your World", which was referred to by songwriter Howard Ashman as the "I Want" song, was originally going to be cut from the final film, owing to Jeffrey Katzenberg's belief that it slowed the story down, but Ashman and Keane fought to keep it in.

Ariel's original design was developed by animator Glen Keane. Her appearance was based on a number of inspirational sources, Christie Brinkley, Alyssa Milano (who was 16 at the time in addition to hosting the making of the special on Disney Channel,) and model-comedian Sherri Stoner, who provided live-action references for the animators during the development of the film. She would later do the live-action references for Belle (Paige O'Hara) in Beauty and the Beast. The movement of Ariel's hair underwater was based on footage of astronaut Sally Ride while she was in space. Extra reference was given by filming Stoner swimming in a pool, which also helped guide Ariel's aquatic movement.

A challenge in animating Ariel for the 1989 film was the color required to show Ariel in the changing environments, both under the sea and on land, for which the animators required thirty-two color models, not including costume changes. The sea-green color of Ariel's mermaid tail was a hue specially mixed by the Disney paint lab; the color was named "Ariel" after the character. The choice of red as Ariel's hair color was the subject of dispute between the filmmakers and studio executives who wanted the character to have blonde hair. It was noted that red hair contrasted better with Ariel's green tail, red was easier to darken than yellow, and Disney's live-action branch Touchstone Pictures had recently released Splash that had a blonde mermaid; Ariel's red hair was ultimately kept.

In an interview, Jodi Benson stated that for Ariel's Beginning, the writers revised the script multiple times to make sure Ariel retained her relevance in a more modern context. Benson complained to them that they wrote Ariel out of character and suggested they bring her back to her roots.

Characteristics
Ariel is the youngest of King Triton and Queen Athena's seven daughters. She is often seen in the company of Flounder, her best friend, and Sebastian, her father's advisor who is often assigned to keep an eye on her. In the television series and first film, Ariel has a fascination with the human world and often goes off to find human artifacts that she displays in a secret grotto. Ariel is often rebellious, wandering off on her own to explore her surroundings, and frequently disobeys the orders of her father or Sebastian, causing conflict between the characters. In The Little Mermaid, she is depicted as being willing to do anything to be with Prince Eric, even giving up her voice to become human. Clements described her as a typical teenager, prone to errors of judgment. She also is incredibly curious, and her curiosity often leads her into dangerous situations.

Ariel is kind and caring to others no matter what their circumstances, as depicted in the television series. In an early episode, Ariel helps an orphaned merboy who had fallen in with a bad crowd. In another episode, Ariel befriends a supposed bad luck creature and protects it from Ursula and other merfolk who wish it harm. Ariel appears as an adult in Return to the Sea and gives birth to a daughter named Melody, becoming the first, and currently, only, Disney princess to become a mother. Ariel is protective of her daughter, as Triton was of Ariel in the first film. After Morgana threatens Ariel and King Triton, Prince Eric and Ariel build a wall around the palace to protect Melody from Morgana and other terrors of the ocean. Although it protected her, it could not protect her curiosity. Ariel's Beginning depicts her personality as it was in the original film after Jodi Benson had advocated returning the character to her roots. Ariel is once again rebellious, and after her father decrees music to be banned in Atlantica she runs away with Sebastian and his band.

Appearances

The Little Mermaid

Ariel first appears in The Little Mermaid (1989), in which she is shown as being adventurous and curious about the world of humans, a fascination which annoys both her father King Triton and his court composer Sebastian, as merfolk are not allowed to make contact with the human world. She and Flounder go in search of human objects, which they take to a seagull named Scuttle for appraisal. Ariel falls in love with a human prince named Prince Eric after saving him from drowning, and visits the sea witch, Ursula, who agrees to turn her into a human in exchange for her voice. Ariel must make Prince Eric fall in love with her and romantically kiss her within three days, lest she belong to Ursula forever.

Unknown to Ariel, this agreement is part of Ursula's bigger plan to trap Ariel's father, King Triton and steal his magical trident. After being transformed, Ariel found that she can no longer breathe, nor swim. Sebastian and Flounder take her to the surface. She is soon found by Eric and is taken back to his castle. Ariel almost manages to obtain the "kiss of true love", but is stopped by Ursula's underhanded tactics. On the second day, Ursula transforms herself into a human, calling herself "Vanessa" and using Ariel's voice, bewitches Eric to make him marry her on the third day. After learning from Scuttle that the woman is Ursula in disguise, Ariel disrupts the wedding and regains her voice, but the sun sets as Ariel and Prince Eric are about to kiss, transforming Ariel back into a mermaid. After transforming herself back into her true witch form, Ursula takes Ariel back into the ocean, where she is met by King Triton and Sebastian.

Triton trades himself for Ariel, enabling Ursula to steal his crown and enabling her to claim his trident, which angers Ariel, who will not allow Ursula to destroy merfolk and humans. In the battle that follows, Ariel is trapped at the bottom of a whirlpool. Before Ursula can kill her, Eric impales Ursula with a derelict ship's splintered prow. After Ursula dies, her spell is broken, and King Triton and the merfolk are transformed back to normal merpeople. At the end of the film, after King Triton uses his magical trident to transform Ariel into a human, she leaves the sea to live in the human world. She and Eric marry and live happily ever after.

Television series

A prequel television series that originally aired from 1992 to 1994, depicts Ariel's life as a mermaid under the sea with Sebastian, Flounder, and her father. Ariel appears in all 31 episodes of the series, which is set an unspecified time before the first film. The series follows Ariel's adventures with her friends and family and sometimes has Ariel foiling the attempts of enemies that are intent on harming her or the kingdom of Atlantica.

Ariel's relationships with various characters from the film are highlighted and expanded, such as the love and occasional conflict between Ariel and her father, how Ariel met Flounder and Scuttle, the relationships between Ariel and her sisters, and Ariel's early fear and avoidance of Ursula the sea witch. Other recurring new characters are also introduced, such as orphaned merboy Urchin and mute mermaid Gabriella that become Ariel's friends, as well as the Evil Manta, Lobster Mobster and Da Shrimp, who are Ariel's enemies. Ariel's mother is absent, having already died prior to the events of the series, though she is occasionally mentioned in vague terms. In one episode Ariel comes across Hans Christian Andersen, author of "The Little Mermaid", while he was traveling underwater in a primitive submarine. In the fictionalized encounter she saves Andersen's life, inspiring him to write the story.

Some episodes of the series are musical and feature original songs performed by the characters. A soundtrack containing some of these songs was released in 1992 under the title "Splash Hits".

The Little Mermaid II: Return to the Sea

In The Little Mermaid II: Return to the Sea (2000), Ariel, now the new queen of Eric's kingdom has given birth to a daughter named Melody. When Melody's safety is threatened by Ursula's sister Morgana after using her as a hostage to get Triton's trident, Ariel and her husband Eric decide they must keep Melody away from the sea. So they build a large wall to separate it from the castle.

But Melody's love of the sea proves too strong and she visits Morgana, who turns her into a mermaid temporarily. King Triton uses his trident to transform Ariel back into her own mermaid form to find and rescue Melody. Morgana tricks Melody into taking part in a plot to steal her grandfather King Triton's trident. Together with Tip the Penguin and Dash the Walrus she goes to Atlantica and succeeds in acquiring the trident. Ariel arrives as they return with it to Morgana, and tries to persuade Melody to give back the trident. Morgana then reveals her true intentions. She calmly mentions that the spell that turned Melody into mermaid will wear off by sundown, then uses the trident's magic to lord over the ocean, rising to the surface to gloat. Scuttle, Triton, Sebastian, and Eric arrive, and a battle ensues against Morgana and her minions. Soon after the sunset, Morgana's spell wears off, and Melody returns to human form. Ariel saves Eric from Cloak and Dagger who tied him and pulled it into the depths and Melody manages to grab the trident and returns it to King Triton, who then punishes Morgana by sending her to the bottom of the ocean frozen in a block of ice.

Triton returns Ariel to human form, the wall separating Eric's castle from the sea is torn down, and contact between humans and merfolk is restored.

The Little Mermaid: Ariel's Beginning

The prologue of The Little Mermaid: Ariel's Beginning (2008) shows Ariel as a young mermaid, living happily with her father, King Triton, her mother, Queen Athena, and her six older sisters. As Ariel and her family relax in a lagoon, a pirate ship approaches and everyone flees except Athena, who returns to recover a music box Triton had given her and is killed when the ship crushes her. Afterwards, a devastated King Triton bans all music from Atlantica and throws the music box deep into the ocean. Ariel and her sisters grow up forgetting music and living under their father's strict rules, enforced by Marina del Rey, their governess.

Ariel meets Flounder and follows him to a secret underground club where Sebastian and his band play music. There she sings the song "I Remember", which reminds her of her distant past surrounded by love and music, and of her mother. Ariel introduces her sisters to the club, but eventually they are caught thanks to Marina, who had followed them. Sebastian and his band are imprisoned and the club is closed under Triton's orders. After arguing with Triton, Ariel breaks the band out of prison and escapes with them.

With Sebastian's assistance, Ariel finds her mother's music box, and they decide to return it to Triton. On their way back to Atlantica, they encounter Marina, and a struggle ensues in which Ariel is knocked unconscious, witnessed by Triton. Ariel makes a full recovery, and a remorseful Triton allows music back into Atlantica.

In other media

Tie-in music albums
In addition to the film's official soundtrack, two original music albums were released by Walt Disney Records for the franchise: Sebastian from The Little Mermaid (1990) and The Little Mermaid: Songs from the Sea (1992). The former is a cover album mainly focusing on Samuel E. Wright as Sebastian, with Ariel providing supporting vocals, while the latter is a concept album of original songs that depict a day in Ariel's life under the sea. Ariel also appears in Songs and Story: Ariel's Christmas Under the Sea, a Christmas-themed mini-album with a read-along story and two original songs. Jodi Benson performs in-character as Ariel in all these albums.

Printed media
Ariel appears in a number of printed media that have been released as part of the franchise.

A series of twelve prequel novels were published in 1994 by Disney Press, following young Ariel's adventures living under the sea with her sisters and father. The titles are: Green-Eyed Pearl and Nefazia Visits the Palace by Suzanne Weyn; Reflections of Arsulu and The Same Old Song by Marilyn Kaye; Arista's New Boyfriend and Ariel the Spy by M. J. Carr; King Triton, Beware!, The Haunted Palace and The Boyfriend Mix-Up by Katherine Applegate; The Practical-Joke War by Stephanie St. Pierre; The Dolphins of Coral Cove by K. S. Rodriguez; and Alana's Secret Friend by Jess Christopher. The novels mostly focus on the domestic setting of Ariel and her sisters living together.

In 1992, Disney Comics released a four-issue The Little Mermaid Limited Series comic book series. In 1994 Marvel Comics released its own title, Disney's The Little Mermaid, which ran for twelve issues. All these comics are prequels to the film, and feature Ariel a mermaid living under the sea having adventures with Flounder and Sebastian, and thwarting villains that wish to take over or destroy Atlantica.

Ariel appears as a minor character in the 2016 young adult novel Poor Unfortunate Soul: A Tale of the Sea Witch by Serena Valentino, which is part of a Disney Villains series and is mainly about Ursula the Sea Witch. She is also a main character in the 2018 young adult novel Part of Your World by Liz Braswell, which is part of a Disney Twisted Tales series and is set in an alternate universe where Ariel was unable to stop Ursula's wedding to Eric.

Disney Princess
In 2000, Ariel became an official member of the newly launched Disney Princess line, an umbrella franchise that includes various Disney princesses under its banner. Ariel is one of the original 8 characters that were included at the franchise's launch. The franchise is directed at young girls and covers a wide variety of merchandise, including but not limited to magazines, music albums, toys, video games, clothes, and stationery.

This franchise includes illustrated novels starring the various princesses, two of which are about Ariel: The Birthday Surprise and The Shimmering Star Necklace. Both novels are written by Gail Herman, and contain original stories about Ariel's life as a human and Eric's wife, but still maintaining close relationships with her father and sisters under the sea. The franchise also includes illustrated short stories about Ariel's life as a human, such as Ariel and the Aquamarine Jewel, Ariel's Dolphin Adventure, and Ariel's Royal Wedding. Ariel also appears as a supporting character in one volume of the Japanese manga Kilala Princess, where she is seen in her pre-movie mermaid form.

Jodi Benson provides Ariel's voice for her appearances in the Disney Princess music albums, DVDs, and video games. The first original song released for this franchise is "If You Can Dream", which featured Cinderella, Aurora, Ariel, Belle, Pocahontas, Jasmine and Mulan singing together. Other original songs that feature Ariel are "I Just Love Getting Dressed for Tea", "Manners and Etiquette", "The Princess Dance" and "Happy Birthday, Princess" from Disney Princess Tea Party (2005); "Christmas Is Coming!", "Christmas in the Ocean", "Ariel's Christmas Island" and "The Twelve Days of Christmas" from Disney Princess Christmas Album (2009); and "Ariel's Sing-Along Sea Song: the Crab Song" from Disney Princess Party (2010). Ariel also appears in the franchise video games Disney Princess: Enchanted Journey (2007), Disney Princess: Magical Jewels (2007) and Disney Princess: My Fairytale Adventure (2012).

Broadway musical

Ariel appears in the Broadway adaptation of the 1989 film, which ran at the Lunt-Fontanne Theatre with previews from November 3, 2007, leading to opening night on January 10, 2008. This original production closed on August 30, 2009, but other US and international productions have followed since. The character of Ariel for the stage adaptation was originated by Sierra Boggess, who received a nomination for the Drama Desk Award for Outstanding Actress in a Musical for her performance. Jodi Benson, the original voice actress for Ariel, attended the musical's opening night.

In order to portray the characters underwater, the actors wore Heelys wheeled footwear, which simulate the gliding action of swimming creatures. The actors playing Ariel and the other merfolk had wire-frame tails attached to their hips. Subsequent productions feature different designs for Ariel and the merfolk; the Dutch and Japanese productions use wirework and aerial stunts to create the illusion of underwater swimming.

The stage musical follows the basic structure of the film, but there are some differences between the two. In this version, Ursula is Triton's sister and Ariel's aunt. In a new subplot, Grimsby holds a contest inviting all the princesses in the land for a singing competition for Eric to choose his bride; Ariel cannot sing, but she dances for Eric, and he chooses her. Ariel also has a more active role in the final battle, where she is the one who defeats Ursula by destroying her Nautilus shell that contains her power.

In addition to the songs in the film, Ariel has new songs by Alan Menken and lyrics by Glenn Slater. "The World Above" is Ariel's introductory song, where she expresses her admiration and curiosity with the human world, "Beyond My Wildest Dreams" is performed after Ariel has become human and given up her voice, and is used to express her thoughts about the human world and Eric, and "If Only (quartet)" is a quartet between Ariel, Eric, King Triton and Sebastian where all four express longing and sadness for their current situation: Ariel saddened that she only has one day left to get Eric to kiss her, Eric's confusion of falling for Ariel despite longing for the mysterious girl who saved his life, King Triton's regret at driving Ariel away, and Sebastian for his inability to help Ariel achieve her dreams.

Disney Parks

Ariel makes regular appearances in the Walt Disney Parks and Resorts, having a special location called Ariel's Grotto at most of them. Ariel's Grotto was torn down at Walt Disney World's Magic Kingdom owing to the Fantasyland expansion. "The Little Mermaid" mini-land can be found in the Magic Kingdom's New Fantasyland. It includes a replica of Prince Eric's Castle, a dark ride called Ariel's Undersea Adventure, a market called "Prince Eric's Village Market", and Ariel's meeting grotto. She has a major role in Mickey's PhilharMagic and stars in her own live stage shows at Disney's Hollywood Studios and Tokyo DisneySea. A dark ride based on the movie was designed for Disneyland Paris but never built. A re-designed version of the attraction, called Ariel's Undersea Adventure, was built as part of the major expansion for Disney California Adventure Park. She also has her own hotel at the Disney's Art of Animation Resort. There is a land in Tokyo DisneySea titled "Mermaid Lagoon". It features many rides and attractions themed around the Little Mermaid. A clone of the dark ride found in Disney California Adventure Park and Magic Kingdom was to be a part of Fantasyland in Hong Kong Disneyland but was never built. A clone of the dark ride was also supposed to be in Tokyo DisneySea but was canceled due to budget reasons. A Little Mermaid dark ride is or was planned in every Disney resort worldwide.

Video games and television
Not long after the film was released, late Muppet creator Jim Henson proposed a live-action show based on the film, titled Little Mermaid's Island. Ariel was to be portrayed by Marietta DePrima, and she would interact with various puppet characters created by Jim Henson's Creature Shop. Two episodes of this series were filmed but not aired due to complications after Henson's death.

Ariel appears in various video games based on the films, including the two adaptations of the first film (one for NES and Game Boy, known as The Little Mermaid, and one for Sega consoles called Ariel the Little Mermaid) and the popular Kingdom Hearts series. In the first Kingdom Hearts, Ariel's story has an unrelated plot to that of the movie. Ariel also makes an appearance in the sequel, Kingdom Hearts II, where its storyline loosely follows the plotline of the 1989 film. Ariel makes another appearance in Kingdom Hearts III as a summon for Sora. Other video games based on the character include a pinball adaption of the second movie and three children's titles for personal computers: Ariel's Story Studio, The Little Mermaid Activity Center and Disney's The Little Mermaid Print Studio. In addition, Ariel appears in multiple games within the Disney Princess line of games, including Disney Princess: Enchanted Journey and Disney Princess: My Fairytale Adventure.

In 2001, Ariel appeared occasionally in the animated television series Disney's House of Mouse as one of Mickey's guests at the nightclub. She is seen in both her mermaid and human forms.

On November 24, 2013, Ariel made a brief appearance in a TV special Sofia the First: The Floating Palace, which is part of the computer-animated television series Sofia the First. In the special, Sofia is trying to help her mermaid friend, Oona, whose underwater kingdom is under threat. Sofia wishes for help, and the magical amulet of Avalor summons Ariel in her mermaid form, who gives Sofia advice on what to do. Ariel performs the song "The Love We Share" with Sofia. Jodi Benson reprises her role in the episode as well.

Once Upon a Time

A live-action version of Ariel appeared in the ABC television series Once Upon a Time, where she was played by JoAnna Garcia.

Concert
In 2016 a stripped-down concert version of The Little Mermaid was staged at the Hollywood Bowl, featuring the songs from the film and four songs from the Broadway musical. Sara Bareilles performed the role of Ariel for the first two nights of the concert (June 4 and 5), while Jodi Benson, the original voice actress for Ariel, reprised her role for the June 6 performance.

Ralph Breaks the Internet
Ariel, alongside other Disney Princesses, appeared in the film, as was announced at the 2017 D23 Expo. She gives Vanellope advice on singing about her dreams, which leads to her singing A Place Called Slaughter Race later in the film.

The Little Mermaid Live!

In 2019 ABC aired a musical television special performed with a live audience, where footage of the 1989 film was interwoven with live musical performances of songs from the film and Broadway stage musical. Auliʻi Cravalho performed as Ariel in this production, and Jodi Benson introduced the show.

Live-action film adaptation

In May 2016, Deadline Hollywood reported that Disney was in early development for a live-action adaptation of the film. In 2019, Halle Bailey was cast in the starring role as Ariel. The film is scheduled to be released on May 26, 2023.

Reception and legacy
Ariel has received mixed reception from critics. Roger Ebert of the Chicago Sun-Times praised the character, writing that "Ariel is a fully realized female character who thinks and acts independently, even rebelliously, instead of hanging around passively while the fates decide her destiny." James Bernardelli of Reelviews wrote that Ariel can be viewed as a template for future Disney heroes and heroines. He also praised Jodi Benson's vocal performance for the character. In an article for Empire, Levi Buchanan stated that Ariel is "powerful and self-reliant." Janet Maslin of The New York Times complimented Ariel, stating that "teenagers will appreciate the story's rebellious heroine" and went on to praise Ariel's wit. Josh Tyler of Cinema Blend wrote favorably about Ariel, although he believed that the character was eroticized, stating "The scene where Ursula rips out her throat and gives her extremely naked parts below the waist is almost titillating, though I'm sure to little kids it seems entirely innocent." Similarly, reviewer John Puccio said that "Ariel is perhaps the sexiest-looking animated character the Disney artists have ever drawn." In his review of Ariel's Beginning, James Plath of DVD Town wrote, "For little girls, Ariel is one of the most beloved of Disney princesses, and she holds a warm place in the hearts of parents as well." Rory Aronsky of Film Threat praised Jodi Benson's vocal performance in Ariel's Beginning, writing that "Benson adds more to the appeal of Ariel for older fans, and younger girls just learning about her, as well as generations not born yet who will undoubtedly become attached to her, ensuring the continued existence of the franchise."

In their review of The Little Mermaid, the staff of TV Guide wrote that Ariel resembled "a big-haired, denatured Barbie doll, despite her hourglass figure and skimpy seashell brassiere."
Tamara Weston of Time wrote that while Ariel is less passive and more strong-willed than her predecessors, she still "gives up her voice to be with a man" who comes to her rescue at the film's climax. Hal Hinson of The Washington Post wrote that it would be difficult for children to relate to Ariel's "feelings of disenchantment and longing for another world" and that she "doesn't have much personality." However, he also wrote a positive statement about Ariel, saying it was "refreshing ... to see a heroine who has some sense of what she wants and the resources to go after it." Nell Minow of Common Sense Media had a mixed view of Ariel, praising her for being "adventuresome, rebellious, and brave," but also criticizing that she "gives up everything – her family, her home, her voice – for love, even though her trust in the sea witch puts everyone she loves in danger." Daphne Lee of The Star called Ariel "annoying" and went on to state that she "is a silly girl who gives up her voice and her family for a man she knows next to nothing about."

It was largely the results of these initial negative reviews regarding Ariel, that resulted in then-Disney Animation chairman Jeffrey Katzenberg deciding to add in a "feminist twist" to the next Disney fairy tale adaptation, Beauty and the Beast, and by extension make the film's female protagonist, Belle, into a feminist, as well as hire Linda Woolverton to act as the main screenwriter for the film. Despite her mixed critical reception, Ariel remains popular with audiences and is considered one of Disney's most iconic and beloved animated characters, with her specific color combination of red hair, lavender seashells, and green tail making her distinctly identifiable. A poll in the Internet Movie Database showed Ariel to be the second most alluring animated character after Jessica Rabbit. In August 2011, Jodi Benson was honored as a Disney Legend for her work as Ariel and her other projects at Disney. Although Belle is still often regarded and praised as Disney's first true feminist princess, fans and critics state that Ariel is because of her desire for independence, as well as being the first Disney princess to save her prince's life in her film.

A bi-annual convention called ArielCon is dedicated to the character. Ariel is an official "ambassador" for the "Keep Our Oceans Clean" campaign by Environmental Defense, The National Maritime Sanctuary, and The National Oceanic and Atmospheric Administration. From 2007 onwards, Disney launched an advertising campaign called Disney Dreams Portraits featuring celebrities dressed up as various Disney characters and photographed Annie Leibovitz; Julianne Moore was photographed as Ariel for this campaign.

"Hipster Ariel" has become a popular internet meme, utilizing a screenshot of Ariel with photoshopped glasses accompanied by a humorous caption. The popularity of the Hipster Ariel meme also led Funko to produce a line of Funko Pop figures based on the Hipster Disney Princess meme. Ariel's distinct appearance makes her the subject of "look-alike" events and competitions.

References

External links

Ariel at Disney.com

The Little Mermaid (franchise) characters
Disney Princess characters
Fictional Atlanteans
Fictional mermen and mermaids
Fictional queens
Fictional princesses
Film characters introduced in 1989
Teenage characters in television
Teenage characters in musical theatre
Female characters in musical theatre
Teenage characters in animated films